Henry Ellis Warren (May 21, 1872 – September 21, 1957) was an American inventor credited with invention of the first synchronous electric clock which kept time from the oscillations of the power grid in  1918 as well as with 134 other inventions.
Warren founded Warren Telechron Company in 1912 which later was acquired by General Electric in 1943.
Warren was noted as the "father of electric time". Telechron went out of business in 1992.
Just between 1916 and 1926 the company sold 20 million clocks. The clocks remained popular into the 1950s.
In 1940 he also invented the "singing clock" which instead of a pendulum had a vibrating metal string.

Warren's early career started as an engineer for Nathaniel Lombard, designing water-driven machinery for the N. Lombard Improved Governor Co. in Roxbury, MA. He worked his way up to Plant Superintendent, eventually purchasing the company in 1937, at which time it was renamed Lombard Governor Company. He was owner and president of Lombard up until his death in 1957.

Notable awards 
 1935: Lamme Medal from the American Institute of Electrical Engineers
 1935: John Price Wetherill Medal from the Franklin Institute

Early life and education 
Warren was born in Boston and attended the Allen School.
Warren graduated from Massachusetts Institute of Technology in 1894 with degree of Bachelor of Science in Electrical Engineering.

Some of Telechron clocks

See also 
 Warren's talk on modern clocks

References 

1872 births
1957 deaths
American inventors
American businesspeople
MIT School of Engineering alumni
IEEE Lamme Medal recipients